Dzhardzhan is a rural locality (a selo), in Zhigansky Rural Okrug of Zhigansky District in the Sakha Republic, Russia, located  from Zhigansk, the administrative center of the district. Its population as of the 2010 Census was 1, up from 0 recorded during the 2002 Census.

Climate

References

Notes

Sources
Official website of the Sakha Republic. Registry of the Administrative-Territorial Divisions of the Sakha Republic. Zhigansky District. 

Rural localities in Zhigansky District
Populated places on the Lena River